Anne Renée (born Manon Kirouac; August 24, 1950) is a Canadian pop singer who rose to fame in Quebec in the 1970s.

Biography 
Anne Renée was born in Laval, Quebec. In 1964, she released her debut song under her real name, Manon Kirouac. She had some success on discs and pursued her career in music until 1968, when she decided to complete her education. Later she started using her pop song name Anne Renée. Her friend, singer Johnny Farago, introduced her to producer Guy Cloutier, who took her under his wing. She became one of the most popular female singers in Quebec with hits like "Un amour d'adolescent" (a translation of a Paul Anka song) and "On trouve l'amour" (by the composer François Bernard of SOCAN). It was around this time that she fell in love with Cloutier's partner, René Angélil, whom she married in 1973, and with whom she had two children: Jean-Pierre (b. 1974) and Anne-Marie (b. 1977). Her musical career ended in 1979. She worked for two years as host and singer on the show Les Tannants, with Pierre Marcotte. She permanently left the art scene after that. In 1986, she divorced Angélil and moved to California, while Angélil went on to marry Canadian singer Celine Dion.

Discography

45 rpm records

Under the name Manon Kirouac 
 1965 – Ding dong / Ta vallée lointaine
 1966 – C'est le temps de l'école / Il y avait la lune
 1966 – Je veux chanter / Danser le sloopy
 1967 – L'école à gogo / Si vous connaissez quelque chose de pire qu'un vampire
 1967 – Les filles / Mon cœur n'est pas à vendre
 1968 – Le mariage / La première valse
 1969 – Je suis ton amie / Une fille et un garçon (avec Gilles Rousseau)

Under the name Anne Renée 
 1970 – Le jonc d'amitié / Pas de mariage
 1971 – Un jour, l'amour viendra / Toute petite
 1971 – Qu'il est pénible d'aimer / Instrumental
 1971 – Dis-moi, maman / Puisqu'il faut se quitter
 1972 – Un amour d'adolescent / Toi et moi
 1972 – Vacances d'été / L'été sur la plage (with Johnny Farago)
 1972 – L'été est là / Copacabana (with Johnny Farago, Patrick Zabé, René Simard and Gilles Girard)
 1972 – On trouve l'amour / Pancho (by SOCAN composer François Bernard)
 1972 – Pour la première fois, Noël sera gris /Noël blanc
 1973 – Symphonie d'amour / Pedro Gomez (by SOCAN composer François Bernard)
 1973 – Symphonie d'amour / Instrumental 
 1973 – Quand j'étais une enfant / Tu ne sais pas ce qu'est l'amour
 1973 – Ça nous fait pleurer / Aujourd'hui
 1974 – Il est là, mon enfant / Sur le bord de ma tasse de café
 1974 – Je veux savoir / Aujourd'hui
 1974 – Une nuit dans tes bras / Aujourd'hui
 1975 – Le docteur m'a dit / Toute petite
 1975 – Un jeu d'fou / Sur le bord de ma tasse de café 
 1976 – Embrasse-le / Instrumental
 1976 – Hasta Manana / Aujourd'hui
 1977 – Une dose de rock'n roll / Aujourd'hui c'est ta fête
 1977 – Tu remplis ma vie / Une dose de rock'n roll
 1978 – Je ne sais pas / Instrumental

33 rpm records on CD 
 1972 – Cadeau de Noël
 1972 – Un amour d'adolescent
 1973 – Quand j'étais une enfant
 1980 – Anne Renée
 2000 – Anne Renée: Un amour d'adolescent (compilation)

References 

1950 births
Living people
Musicians from Quebec
People from Laval, Quebec
Francophone Quebec people
French-language singers of Canada
Canadian expatriates in the United States